Timmy Ladner (born July 4, 1963) is an American politician who has represented the 93rd district in the Mississippi House of Representatives since 2012.

References

1963 births
Living people
Republican Party members of the Mississippi House of Representatives
21st-century American politicians